Deb Cuthbert (born December 5, 1977 in Edinburgh, Scotland) is a former field hockey player from Canada.

Cuthbert earned a total number of more than fifty international caps for the Canadian National Team during her career.

International senior tournaments
 2001 – Americas Cup, Kingston, Jamaica (3rd)
 2001 – World Cup Qualifier, Amiens/Abbeville, France (10th)
 2002 – Commonwealth Games, Manchester (7th)
 2006 – Commonwealth Games, Melbourne (8th)

External links
 Profile on Field Hockey Canada

1977 births
Living people
Canadian female field hockey players
Field hockey people from Ontario
Field hockey players at the 2002 Commonwealth Games
Field hockey players at the 2006 Commonwealth Games
Naturalized citizens of Canada
Sportspeople from Edinburgh
Scottish emigrants to Canada
Commonwealth Games competitors for Canada